Sudovian (also known as Yotvingian, or Jatvingian) was a Western Baltic language of Northeastern Europe. Sudovian was closely related to Old Prussian. It was formerly spoken southwest of the Nemunas river in what is now Lithuania, east of Galindia and in the north of Yotvingia, and by exiles in East Prussia.

Name
The language is referred to as Yotvingian, Jatvingian or Sudovian. Those names are derived from the southern- and northernmost tribes living in the area. When the Germans learnt the name "Sudovian" from the Prussians, they got to know the name of the northernmost tribe only, while Poles in the south met a tribe calling itself Yatvingian. Both Germans and Poles generalized the terms for all the Baltic inhabiants of the area.

The territory they lived in is referred to as Sudovia [Sunderland], Jotva [Jettwen], Dainavia, or Pollexia.

Classification
Sudovian was an Indo-European language belonging to the Baltic branch. There are several proposals for the classification of the Sudovian language within the Baltic phylum.
 Bezzenberg postulated that Sudovian was a southern Lithuanian dialect.
 Otrębski claimed it to be a transitional language between Eastern and Western Baltic.
 Some consider it a distinct Western Baltic language close to Old Prussian.
 Others view it as an Old Prussian dialect.

Historical sources state that Sudovian was very similar to and mutually intelligible with the archaic Old Prussian language, e.g. in the introduction to the 1st Old Prussian Catechism (printed in Königsberg – 1545  – the 1st Baltic language book):

 – "But the Sudovians, although their speech is somewhat lower, understand this Prussian language, as it is printed in the Catechism, and they express themselves well and understand every word".

In addition to similarities in the scarce material in the Western Baltic languages, this leads most linguists to the conclusion, that Sudovian belongs to the Western Baltic branch. Sudovian along with Old Prussian was later influenced by Gothic language, while most of the Eastern Baltic languages had more contact with Finnic languages.

History

Peter of Dusburg, in his 14th-century Chronicon terrae Prussiae, refers to Sudovia and to its inhabitants as Sudovites, listing them as one of the Prussian tribes. He attests, that between 1,500 and 1,600 Sudavians were forcefully relocated to Sambia in the late 13th century.

After the district was conquered by the Teutonic Knights, the language died out and its speakers were gradually absorbed by German, Lithuanian and Slavic populations.

John Poliander wrote in 1535 about the Sudovians living near Königsberg, Prussia, that 32 villages used Sudini speech in a 6–7 mile stretch of land of the Samland Corner that bears the name of Sudavia. They spoke a language similar to the Old Prussian language, but they used the term  for amber, not the Sambian (Old Prussian) term. From him we learn that the Sudovians lived secluded from the Sambians, that they married within their own tribe, and did not allow intermarriage with the neighbouring Prussian population "even if begged". They stubbornly held to their own traditions, and wore finger and ear rings with bronze bells and silver belts. Nothing was imported from abroad, but everything was produced by local craftsmen.

Christoph Hartknoch reported in 1684 that there were still Sudovians in Sambia.

Phonology

Consonants
Based on onomastics, Sudovian is thought to have had the following consonants:

  and  turned into  and  respectively.

Vowels

Diphthongs
Two diphthongs are attested:

Grammar
The few grammatical features proposed for the Sudovian languages are either based on supposed Sudovian substrate in other languages or based on the Polish-Yotvingian Vocabulary (it is unsure, whether or not it represents Sudovian). Therefore, few can be said with certainty.

The language seems to have preserved many archaic features, which have been lost in other Baltic languages. The language from the vocabulary retained the Proto-Baltic singular neuter case endings (as did Prussian), leaving the language with three genders.

The language has six grammatical cases: nominative, vocative (The vocative example is "" form the Sudovian Book), accusative, genitive, dative and locative, and a complex morphology with a variety of moods. It was a frontier dialect of Old Baltic, which preserved many archaic features which had been lost in the Middle Baltic group.

Corpus of the Sudovian language

Onomastics
The Constit. Synod. Evangel. of 1530 contains the following list of deities who were still worshipped by the Sudavians in Samland: "Occopirmus, Sualxtix, Ausschauts, Autrympus, Potrympus, Bardoayts, Piluuytis, Parcunas, Pecols,...".

Toponyms from north-eastern Poland, north-western Belarus, and Lithuania also preserve words.

Evidence from other languages
The Yotvingian territories were later overrun and populated by Slavs around present-day Białystok and Suwałki in north-eastern Poland and nearby Hrodna (formerly Grodno) in Belarus. Some elements of Baltic speech are still retained in the Belarus and Ukraine territory, owing to the sparse indigenous populations and resettlements of refugees from Lithuania. The dialect of Zietela was of particular interest. Kazlauskas suggested that the word mėnas ("month") (dative singular mënui) encountered in dialects (Zietela, Lazdijai) and in the writings of Bretkūnas  is a remnant of nouns with the stem suffix -s. The dialect of Druskininkai in Lithuania, too, was influenced by the Sudovian language.

Fragmentary Texts
There are also some Sudovian language phrases in "Warhafftige Beschreibung der Sudawen auff Samland sambt ihren Bock heyligen und Ceremonien" – True Description of the Sudovians in Samland together with their goat sanctifications and ceremonies – written in the mid-16th century by Hieronymus Maletius. Most scholars view these texts as representing Old Prussian, while Norbertas Vėlius regards them as genuine Sudovian.

 
 
  (a drinking toast)

Polish-Yotvingian vocabulary
Until the 1970s, Yotvingian was chiefly known from toponyms and medieval Russian sources. But in 1978, a monument with Yotvingian writing was discovered by accident. In Belarus, a young man named Vyacheslav Zinov, an amateur collector, bought a book of Catholic prayers from an old man from  village in the depths of Białowieża Forest, which held a small manuscript titled "". It was written partly in Polish, and partly in an unspecified, "pagan" language. Unfortunately, Zinov's parents threw away the book. However, before the manuscript was destroyed, Zinov had made notes of it which he sent to Vilnius University in 1983. Even though Zinov's notes were riddled with errors, it has been proven beyond doubt that the notes are indeed a copy of an authentic Yotvingian text. According to the first person who analyzed the manuscript, Zigmas Zinkevičius, this short Yotvingian–Polish dictionary (of just 215 words), "Pagan Dialects from Narew", appears to have been written by a Catholic priest in order to preach to locals in their mother tongue. Concerning the language, Zinkevičius put forth three possible versions: 
 a Yotvingian dialect under a heavy influence of Lithuanian;
 Lithuanian words over a strong Yotvingian substratum;
 the compiler of the dictionary could not tell Lithuanian from Yotvingian clearly, and may have included words from both. The latter version is indirectly supported by the name of the document: "Dialects", rather than "Dialect". Some scholars did not rule out the possibility of forgery, but there are strong indications it was not.

See also
Yotvingians / Sudovians
Sudovian glossary (Narew) on Wiktionary

Notes

References

Bibliography
 
Catechiſmus jn Peüßniſcher ſprach, Königsberg, Hans Weinreich, 1545, p. 3
 2nd edition: Catechiſmus jn preüßniſcher ſprach, gecorrigiret vnd dagegen das deüdsche, Königsberg, Hans Weinreich, 1545
 Hartknoch, Christophorus, Alt- und Neues Preussen. Franckfurt & Leipzig, 1684 (Google Books)
Būga, K., Kalba ir senovė, I, Vilnius, 1922, p. 78
Būga, K., Lietuvių kalbos žodynas, I, Vilnius, 1924, p. LXXV
Kazlauskas J., 1968, Lietuvių Kalbos Istorinė Gramatika [Historical Grammar of Lithuanian], Vilnius, 1968, p 285
Salys, A., Sūduviai [including Sūdovian language], Sūduvių Kampas. Liet. Enciklopedija, XXIX, Boston, USA, 1963, pp 114–126
Schmalstieg, W. R., Studies in Old Prussian, (1976) University Park and London, pp 17–23, 91–93, 
Mažiulis, V., Prūsų kalbos paminklai, t. II (1981) Vilnius, pp 62–64, 67–68.
Mažiulis, V., Prūsų kalbos etimologijos žodynas,t. IV, (1997) Vilnius, pp 166–167, 
Vidugiris, A., Zietelos Šnektos žodynas [A Dictionary of the Subdialect of Zietela.], Vilnius: Mokslo ir enciklopedijų leidybos institutas, 1998
Vidugiris, A., Mikulėnienė, D, ZIETELOS ŠNEKTOS TEKSTAI. I dalis [Texts of the Zietela Subdialect. Part I], Vilnius, 2005,  (1 dalis),  (2 dalys)
Mikuleniene, D., Concerning the Influence of the Western Balts on the Accentuation System of Western Lithuanian Dialects, Acta Baltico-Slavica, Instytut Slawistyki Polskiej Akademii Nauk, 2006, vol: 30, pp 89–96
Naktinienė, G., Paulauskienė,A., Vitkauskas, V., Druskininkų tarmės žodynas, Vilnius 1988
Zinkevičius, Zigmas, Lietuvių kalbos dialektologija, Vilnius 1994
Zinkevičius, Zigmas, Lietuvių dialektologija, Vilnius 1966

Zinkevičius Zigmas, Lenkų-jotvingių žodynėlis? – Rinktiniai straipsniai. T. I. Vilnius, 2002. P. 30–60.
Zinkevičius, Zigmas, Nauja apie jotvingių kalbą – Rinktiniai straipsniai. T. I. Vilnius, 2002. P. 61–66.
Gimbutas, Marija, The Balts, (1963) London : Thames and Hudson, pp 19, 22–23, 83, 112, 126, 139, 141, 147, 159.
Gerullis, G., Zur Sprache der Sudauer-Jatwinger. Festschrift Bezzenberger, 1921, p. 44
Hastings, J., Encyclopaedia of Religion and Ethics: Volume IX, New York: Charles Scribner's Sons, 1917, pp 488

External links
 M. Gimbutas book on the Balts, with maps
  Chronicon Terrae Prussiae, Peter von Dusburg

Baltic languages
Medieval languages
West Baltic languages
Extinct Baltic languages
Extinct languages of Europe
Languages of Lithuania
Languages of Poland
Languages extinct in the 17th century